The Interval is a 2012 Italian-Swiss crime-drama film co-written and directed by  Leonardo Di Costanzo.

Plot

Cast 

 Alessio Gallo: Salvatore
 Salvatore Ruocco: Mimmo
 Francesca Riso: Veronica
 Carmine Paternoster: Bernardino

Release and reception 
The film  marked the narrative film debut of Di Costanzo, and premiered in the Horizons section of the 69th Venice International Film Festival, in which it won the Fipresci Prize.

The film was awarded several additional awards, including the David di Donatello for Best New Director, the Nastro d'Argento for best cinematography, the Ciak D'Oro for Best Film and Best First Work and the Foreign Press Grand Prix at the 2013 Globi d'oro.

References

External links

The Interval at Rotten Tomatoes

2012 drama films
Italian drama films 
Swiss drama films  
2010s Italian-language films
2010s Italian films